The Jane Austen Season is a British television series of dramas based on the novels by Jane Austen. The season began on ITV at 9:00 p.m. on Sunday 18 March 2007, with Mansfield Park. The following week, Northanger Abbey was aired. The season ended with the airing of Persuasion on Sunday 1 April 2007. A repeat of the 1996 feature-length film Emma was broadcast on Friday 6 April 2007. The combined ITV and BBC series, titled The Complete Jane Austen, was shown in the United States by the PBS Masterpiece Theatre drama anthology television series from January through April 2008.

United Kingdom
ITV's The Jane Austen Season consisted of the following television films.
 Mansfield Park – first aired on 18 March 2007.
 Northanger Abbey – first aired on 25 March 2007.
 Persuasion – first aired on 1 April 2007.
 Emma – first aired on 24 November 1996 (rebroadcast on 6 April 2007).

United States
The following films and miniseries were first aired in the United States on WGBH-TV as part of the PBS Masterpiece series, The Complete Jane Austen.
 Persuasion – 13 January 2008. Sally Hawkins stars as Anne Elliot.
 Northanger Abbey – 20 January 2008. Felicity Jones plays romance addict Catherine Morland.
 Mansfield Park – 27 January 2008. Austen's most complex plot stars Billie Piper as Fanny Price.
 Miss Austen Regrets – 3 February 2008. Olivia Williams plays the titular role in this biopic dramatizing Austen's lost loves.
 Pride and Prejudice – 10–24 February 2008. Colin Firth portrays Mr. Darcy and Jennifer Ehle portrays Elizabeth Bennet.
 Emma (1996) – 23 March 2008. Kate Beckinsale stars in the title role.
 Emma (2009) – 4–25 October 2009. Romola Garai portrays Emma.
 Sense and Sensibility – 30 March – 6 April 2008. Hattie Morahan plays Elinor Dashwood, and Charity Wakefield plays her sister, Marianne.

See also
 Jane Austen in popular culture
 List of Masterpiece Classic episodes (Season 38)

References

Notes

Citations

External links
 The Complete Jane Austen (archived) at PBS Masterpiece Classic (original edition with 1996's Emma)
 Jane Austen (archived) at PBS Masterpiece Classic (later edition with 2009's Emma)

Television shows based on works by Jane Austen
Television themed seasons
ITV (TV network) original programming
2007 British television seasons